Chaz Carr (born August 30, 1982) is a former Jamaican professional basketball player. He is 1.83 m (6 ft 0 in) tall weighs 182 pounds, and plays point guard. His last professional team was Guaiqueríes de Margarita in Venezuela's first division Liga Profesional de Baloncesto. In 2006, Carr appeared in the Adriatic League with Geoplin Slovan.

High school career
Carr scored 1.273 points during his career at Manchester high school and left the school as its all-time leading scorer. He averaged 21 points per game as a junior and 22 points per game as a senior. In July 2017 he was named to the Manchester Sports Hall of Fame.

College career
Carr graduated from Boston University in 2005, majoring in urban studies. He became the university's eighth all-time leader in scoring (1,406 points), fifth in three-pointers made (177) and 10th in field goals made (470).

Professional career
Besides playing professional basketball in Venezuela, Carr has played in Poland (Unia Tarnów, Polonia Warbud Warszawa), the Dominican Republic (Águilas Cibaeñas), Slovenia (KD Slovan), Austria (Kapfenberg Bulls), Germany (Bremen Roosters) and France (Union Jeanne d'Arc Phalange Quimper).

In August 2008, Carr signed with ÍR of the Úrvalsdeild karla. Due to the Icelandic financial crisis, ÍR released Carr from his contract in October 2008.

Jamaica national team
Carr has played for the Jamaica national basketball team on many occasions. His most noteworthy performance was at the FIBA CBC Championship 2006 where he helped Jamaica win the tournament by averaging 14.6 points, 2.6 rebounds and 3.0 assists per game.

References

External links
Profile at realgm.com
Profile at sports-reference.com

1982 births
Living people
Boston University Terriers men's basketball players
Guaiqueríes de Margarita players
Jamaican men's basketball players
Kapfenberg Bulls players
Point guards
Jamaican expatriate basketball people in the United States
ÍR men's basketball players
American men's basketball players